Ou Zhen (1899–1969), or Ou Chen, was a KMT army general from Qujiang, Guangdong.

He was active in the Second Sino-Japanese War during World War II. He was a commander in the Battle of Shanghai, the Battle of Wuhan (leading the 4th Corps, particularly in the Battle of Wanjialing), the 1st Changsha Campaign, the 1939-40 Winter Offensive, as well as the 2nd and 3rd Changsha Campaigns. He commanded Army Ou Chen in the Changteh Campaign, and the Changsha-Hengyang Campaign of 1944. He again commanded 4th Corps in the Hunan-Kwangtung-Kiangsi Border Areas Operation in early 1945.

After the Communists gained control of mainland China, he fled to Taiwan in 1949. He died in Taipei, and was promoted to general posthumously.

Military positions
1937 General Officer Commanding 90th Division
1938–1944 General Officer Commanding IV Corps
1944 General Officer Commanding Army Ou Chen
1945 General Officer Commanding IV Corps
1945 General Officer Commanding 99th Division

References

External links
Generals from China

National Revolutionary Army generals from Guangdong
Taiwanese people of Hakka descent
Hakka generals
1899 births
1969 deaths
People from Shaoguan